In January 2007, several bus bombs were set off in Sri Lanka

The first was on Friday, January 5, 2007, at about 18:30 local time, during the evening rush hour, near Nittambuwa, 40 km N.E. of the capital Colombo. It used approx. 2 kilograms (4.41 pounds) of explosives, killed 6 people and injured at least 30. 80 people were on board at the time. 10 people were detained for questioning, with regards to this bombing, however, as yet no charges have been lodged.
During the same morning the military had stated that they had performed several raids in the fourth day of action against several rebel sites in the north and northwest, and it was reported that 16 civilians had been killed during the attacks.

The second was on Saturday, January 6, 2007, at around 14:40 local time, near Hikkaduwa, some distance south of the capital, and killed 15 people and injured dozens more. The Sri Lankan Police blamed the attack on LTTE citing that the suspected one of the dead was a suicide bomber. The LTTE denied responsibility.
This explosion followed three bombings, earlier in the day in the north, which killed five, one civilian and four soldiers.

See also
2007 Padahuthurai bombing

Notes

References
(BBC News)
(Reuters)
(Asian Tribune)
(BBC News)
(UPI)
(CNN)
(Asian Tribune)
(CNN)
Bomb Blast Targeting Civiliance Outside Colombo

2007 crimes in Sri Lanka
Attacks on civilians attributed to the Liberation Tigers of Tamil Eelam
Massacres in Sri Lanka
Liberation Tigers of Tamil Eelam attacks in Eelam War IV
Mass murder in 2007
January 2007 events in Asia
Terrorist incidents in Sri Lanka in 2007